Kim Andrew may refer to:

 Kim Andrew (baseball) (born 1953), American baseball player
 Kim Andrew (golfer) (born 1974), English golfer